Karol Gruszecki (born 4 November 1989) is a Polish professional basketball player for Spójnia Stargard of the Polish Basketball League (PLK) and the Polish national basketball team.

Professional career
Gruszecki signed with Spirou Charleroi in Belgium for the 2013–14 season. He finished the season in his home country of Poland, on loan with Czarni Słupsk. For the next season, Gruszecki signed a full contract with Czarni Słupsk. After the 2014–15 season, he was named to the All-PLK First Team. He also finished as runner-up in the voting for Best Polish Player. He signed with reigning PLK champion and EuroLeague team Stelmet Zielona Góra in the 2015 offseason. He played with them for two seasons before signing with Pierniki Toruń.

On 19 February 2018, Torún won its first trophy when it beat  Zielona Góra 88–80 in the final of the Polish Cup. Gruszecki was named the tournament's Most Valuable Player.

On July 15, 2020, he has signed with Trefl Sopot of PLK.v

On June 28, 2022, he has signed with Spójnia Stargard of the Polish Basketball League (PLK).

International career
Gruszecki was selected for the Polish national basketball team for EuroBasket 2015 and 2017.

References

1989 births
Living people
2019 FIBA Basketball World Cup players
Basket Zielona Góra players
Czarni Słupsk players
Karol
Junior college men's basketball players in the United States
Polish expatriate basketball people in Belgium
Polish expatriate basketball people in the United States
Polish men's basketball players
Shooting guards
Small forwards
Spirou Charleroi players
Spójnia Stargard players
Sportspeople from Łódź
Twarde Pierniki Toruń players
Trefl Sopot players
UT Arlington Mavericks men's basketball players